David Sutton may refer to:
 David Russell Sutton (1895–1970), Canadian politician
 David Sutton (archivist) (born 1950), British archival researcher, recipient of a Benson Medal
 Dave Sutton (footballer, born 1957), English footballer and football manager
 Dave Sutton (footballer, born 1966), English footballer
 David Sutton (writer) (born 1966), writer and editor of Fortean Times
 Sid Owen (born 1972), British actor, born David Sutton
 David Sutton (singer), singer with Triumphant Quartet
 David Sutton (American football) (born 1984), arena football wide receiver
 David Sutton, photographer of Playboy Playmates of 1957